Croatian Growth (acronym Hrast is a Croatian word for Oak tree) or Hrast-Movement for Successful Croatia was a political party in Croatia established in 2012. Its founding was initiated by several conservative Catholic NGOs, Croatian section of Radio Maria, Croatian Republican Union, Family Party, Christian Democrat politician Ante Ledić, author Hrvoje Hitrec and two candidates in 2010 Presidential elections in Croatia, historian Josip Jurčević and Miroslav Tuđman, son of first Croatian president Franjo Tuđman. The party maintains contacts with European Christian Political Movement.

In the 2013 European Parliament election, Croatian Growth received 2,55% of votes, which was not enough to gain a seat.

The party participated in the Patriotic Coalition at the 2015 Croatian parliamentary election. In that election, it became possible for candidates to receive preferential votes, and the candidates of Hrast won a total of 8,800 (out of a coalition total of 771,070).

Ladislav Ilčić served as MP until new 2016 Croatian parliamentary election when he was replaced by Hrvoje Zekanović, party's vicepresident.

Since April 2018 HRAST is no longer part of the ruling HDZ coalition because of disagreement over the ratification of the Istanbul Convention.

In July 2018 HRAST signed a political cooperation pact with Croatian Conservative Party. In February 2019 they launched political platform called Croatian Sovereignists together with several NGOs and prominent intellectuals for the upcoming 2019 European Parliament election.

On October 2, 2021, a unification assembly was held in Croatia's capital Zagreb. During the assembly it was announced, that three smaller conservative and right-wing parties (Croatian Conservative Party, Croatian Growth - Movement for Successful Croatia and the Generation of Renewal) will become defunct to merge and work together as the Croatian Sovereignists.

Election history

Legislative

European Parliament

References

External links
 

Conservative parties in Croatia
Political parties established in 2011
Political parties disestablished in 2021
2011 establishments in Croatia
2021 disestablishments in Croatia
National conservative parties
Social conservative parties
European Christian Political Movement